Andre Campbell may refer to:

 Andrae Campbell (born 1989), Jamaican footballer
 Andre Campbell (physician), American physician